Neal Evan Guggemos is a former NFL defensive back and kick returner. He played for the Minnesota Vikings and New York Giants.

Early years

Guggemos attended Holy Trinity High School in Winsted, Minnesota. As a four sport athlete, he earned 14 varsity letters and finished in 2nd place in the long jump and triple jump at the Minnesota State High School track and field meet.

College career 

After high school, Guggemos attended the University of St. Thomas in St. Paul, Minnesota, where he was a football News All-American in 1986 and a Kodak All-American defensive back in 1985 and 1986 for the Tommies. He finished his career with 25 interceptions, which at the time, was 3rd most all time in NCAA history, regardless of division.

He also helped lead the Tommies to the 1985 D-III Men's Indoor Track and Field Championship. He won 6 All-American awards in both the long jump and the triple jump during his collegiate track and field career.

Professional career 

Guggemos signed with the Minnesota Vikings as an undrafted free agent in 1986. He didn't see any action on the field until 1987, when he was 2nd in the league behind Paul Palmer with 808 return yards on 36 kick returns, averaging 22.4 yards per kick return. He also had an interceptions as a defensive back.

In 1988, Guggemos signed with the New York Giants. He had 17 kick returns for 344 yards.

In 1989, Guggemos signed with the Buffalo Bills, but was cut in the preseason.

Personal life

Neal is married to Julie Guggemos. His older son, Nick, played wide receiver at Neal's alma mater, St. Thomas until the program was kicked out of the MIAC. He signed with the Seattle Seahawks on May 6, 2021 as a tight end. His younger son, Matt, plays defensive back for the Minnesota Golden Gophers. He also has a daughter, Alexa.

References

External links
 Football Database
 Database Football

Players of American football from Minnesota
1964 births
Living people
People from McLeod County, Minnesota
New York Giants players